Alain Bangama Ndizeye (born 20 December 1986 in Bujumbura) is a Burundian defender who plays with AS Inter Star in the Burundi Premier League.

Club career 

Bangama began his career in the Burundian first division, playing with the side from Chanic from 1999 to 2000. After a two year stint, he joined Rwandan side SC Kiyovu Sport for two years.

Bangama returned to Burundi where he played for several clubs from the capital Bujumburu. From 2002 to 2003 he played for Prince Louis FC, from 2003 to 2005, he played for Atletico. In 2005, he joined Vital'O F.C.

After two years with Vital'O F.C., he signed in winter 2008 for AS Inter Star.

International career 

Bangama has made several appearances for the Burundi national football team, including FIFA World Cup qualifiers.

References

External links 
 

1986 births
Living people
Burundian footballers
Burundi international footballers
Association football defenders
Sportspeople from Bujumbura
Burundian expatriate sportspeople in Rwanda
Burundian expatriate footballers
Expatriate footballers in Rwanda
S.C. Kiyovu Sports players
Vital'O F.C. players
Prince Louis FC players